Bagerhat-4 is a constituency represented in the Jatiya Sangsad (National Parliament) of Bangladesh from 2020 by Amirul Alam Milon of the Awami League.

Boundaries 
The constituency encompasses Morrelganj, and Sarankhola upazilas.

Members of Parliament

References

External links
 

Parliamentary constituencies in Bangladesh